John Herbert Butler (1937 – 2010) was a footballer who played as a central defender in the Football League for Notts County and Chester. He was ever present when Notts County won promotion from Division Four in the 1959–60 season.
Butler moved on a free transfer from Notts County to Chester in 1962.

Declined the opportunity to manage Nantwich on the club's return to the Cheshire County League in 1968 but signed as a player before injury forced him to retire early in the 1968/69 campaign.

References

1937 births
2010 deaths
Footballers from Birmingham, West Midlands
Association football central defenders
English footballers
Notts County F.C. players
Chester City F.C. players
English Football League players